Lee Hye-young (born December 22, 1971) is a South Korean actress, singer and businesswoman. As a singer in the 1990s, Lee released two dance music albums each with 1730 and Coco, and one album as a solo artist. When she switched to acting, Lee starred in television series such as Premonition (1997), Dal-ja's Spring (2007) and Queen of Housewives (2009), and also founded the fashion brand Miss Dorothy.

Career 
Lee Hye-young made her entertainment debut as a singer performing dance music. In 1992, she became part of the three-member K-pop group 1730 alongside Kim Joo-hoon and Hwang Ho-young; 1730 released two albums then disbanded. Lee and Yoon Hyun-sook (from another defunct group ZAM) then formed the duo Coco in 1994, which also released two albums. Following two soundtrack contributions, she released her first album as a solo artist, Her First Sense in 2000, and a Christmas single in 2008.

Lee began acting in 1995, and went on to star in television dramas such as First Love (1996), Premonition (1997), Can't Help Being Born Well (2001), Dal-ja's Spring (2007) and Kimchi Cheese Smile (2008), as well as the films If (2000) and How the Lack of Love Affects Two Men (2006). Lee notably drew praise in the role of a high school geek-turned-glamorous leader of an elite clique of corporate spouses in ratings hit Queen of Housewives, for which she won an Excellence Award at the 2009 MBC Drama Awards.

Lee soon built a reputation for being one of trendiest and most fashionable Korean celebrities (pre-stardom, she previously worked as a stylist for the band Chakra). She parlayed this to another successful career when she launched the clothing and accessories brand Miss Dorothy in 2004. More than just a model and endorser for Miss Dorothy, as CEO Lee oversaw the brand's product design and development, marketing and promotion; she also became a director for lingerie company M Corset when it merged with Miss Dorothy in 2007. Once she entered her forties, Lee felt that her age would be incompatible with Miss Dorothy's target demographic of women in their twenties and thirties, so she left the company and sold her shares in 2012, then donated all the proceeds to charity.

Lee also wrote the books The Beauty Bible and The Fashion Bible in 2009, and hosted fashion-focused talk shows on cable, such as Style Magazine (2008-2009) and Women& (2012).

In 2017, Lee announced the official opening of her art gallery in New York with a total of 21 paintings on display.

Personal life 
Lee dated Roo'ra singer and music producer Lee Sang-min for eight years before the couple married in 2004. They divorced in 2005, after one year and two months. She remarried on July 19, 2011 in Hawaii to a banker/mergers and acquisitions expert.

Philanthropy 
On March 6, 2022, Lee donated 10 million won to the Hope Bridge Disaster Relief Association to help the victims of the massive wildfire that started in Uljin, Gyeongbuk and has spread to Samcheok, Gangwon.

On February 9, 2023, Lee donated 10 million won to help 2023 Turkey–Syria earthquake, by donating money through Hope Bridge National Disaster Relief Association.

Filmography

Television series

Film

Television show

Discography

Book

Awards and nominations

References

External links 
 
 
 
 
 
  (A few of her movie credits (Ggorichineun namja, If, Bet on My Disco) have been wrongly attributed to a different Lee Hye-young)

1971 births
Living people
South Korean television actresses
South Korean film actresses
Musicians from Incheon